The 2010 Malaysian Open (also known as the 2010 Proton Malaysian Open for sponsorship reasons) was a tennis tournament played on indoor hard courts. It was the second edition of the Proton Malaysian Open, and was classified as an ATP World Tour 250 Series of the 2010 ATP World Tour. It took place at the Bukit Jalil Sports Complex in Kuala Lumpur, Malaysia.

Entrants

Seeds

 Seeds are based on the rankings of 20 September 2010.

Other entrants
The following players received wildcards into the singles main draw
  Yuki Bhambri
  Si Yew Ming
  Bernard Tomic

The following players received entry from the qualifying draw:
  Igor Andreev
  František Čermák
  Milos Raonic
  Laurent Recouderc

Champions

Men's singles

 Mikhail Youzhny def.  Andrey Golubev, 6–7(7–9), 6–2, 7–6(7–3).
 It was Youzhny's second title of the year, and the seventh of his career.

Men's doubles

 František Čermák /  Michal Mertiňák def.  Mariusz Fyrstenberg /  Marcin Matkowski, 7–6(7–3), 7–6(7–5).

References

External links
 Official website

Proton Malaysian Open
Malaysian Open
2010 in Malaysian tennis